Capitalism Nature Socialism is an academic journal founded by James O'Connor and Barbara Laurence in 1988. It is published by Taylor and Francis. It publishes articles on political ecology, with an ecosocialist perspective.

References

Further reading 
 

Delayed open access journals
Eco-socialism
Environmental humanities journals
Environmental social science journals
Publications established in 1988
Socialist academic journal
Taylor & Francis academic journals
Quarterly journals